Orlando is a British television thriller series for young adults which ran for four series between 1965 and 1968. Made by Associated-Rediffusion for the ITV network, it stars Sam Kydd as Orlando O'Connor, the character he had played in the adult television series Crane.

Only four episodes out of the 76 made are known to still exist; the remainder are lost.

Cast

Plot
Orlando O'Connor is an ex-Foreign Legionnaire who has picked up a magic talisman, the "Gizzmo". His boat building firm fails and he travels to London's Docklands to meet an old Navy comrade Tony, looking for work, only to find Tony has been killed. He links up with David and Jenny who have inherited a detective agency from their Uncle. They set out to solve Tony's murder. After that they run the Detective agency together.

References

External links

Orlando at TelevisionHeaven.co.uk

ITV television dramas
Television shows produced by Associated-Rediffusion
1960s British children's television series
English-language television shows